Not the End of the World may refer to:

 Not the End of the World (Brookmyre novel) (1998), by Christopher Brookmyre
 Not the End of the World (McCaughrean novel) (2004), by Geraldine McCaughrean
 Not the End of the World (short story collection) (2002), by Kate Atkinson
 "Not the End of the World" (song), a 2020 song by Katy Perry